Dicranaceae is a family of haplolepideous mosses (Dicranidae) in class Bryopsida. Species within this family are dioicous. Genera in this family include Dicranum, Dicranoloma, and Mitrobryum.

Classification
The family Dicranaceae contains the following genera:

Anisothecium 
Aongstroemia 
Aongstroemiopsis 
Braunfelsia 
Brotherobryum 
Bryotestua 
Camptodontium 
Campylopodium 
Chorisodontium 
Cnestrum 
Cryptodicranum 
Dicnemon 
Dicranella 
Dicranoloma 
Dicranum 
Diobelonella 
Eucamptodon 
Eucamptodontopsis 
Holomitriopsis 
Holomitrium 
Hygrodicranum 
Leptotrichella 
Leucoloma 
Macrodictyum 
Mesotus 
Mitrobryum 
Muscoherzogia 
Orthodicranum 
Paraleucobryum 
Parisia 
Phantomia 
Platyneuron 
Pocsiella 
Polymerodon 
Pseudephemerum 
Pseudochorisodontium 
Schliephackea 
Sclerodontium 
Sphaerothecium 
Steyermarkiella 
Wardia 
Werneriobryum

References

Other sources
 Müller, P. and J.-P. Frahm. 1987. A review of the Paraleucobryoideae (Dicranaceae). Nova Hedwigia 45: 283–314.

Dicranales
Moss families